Salvador Aguirre (1862–1947) was acting President of Honduras for one week, from 9 through 16 September 1919.

In early 1919, by then President of Honduras was Francisco Bertrand Barahona, who his opponents were thrown against a Civil War, for which the provisional presidency went to Salvador Aguirre and that the surrender a week later his successor Dr. Vicente Mejia Colindres, who served as Minister of the Government.

1862 births
1947 deaths
Presidents of Honduras
National Party of Honduras politicians